Made of Steel may refer to:

 "Made of Steel" (song), a song by Our Lady Peace
 Made of Steel, a song by Twilight Force
 Made of Steel (novella), a Doctor Who novella
 Beyond the Law (1992 film), also known as Made of Steel

See also 
 Man of Steel (disambiguation)